Charles d'Orléans de Rothelin (5 August 1691, in Paris – 17 July 1744) was a French churchman, writer, scholar, numismatist and theologian.

A descendant of Dunois, he was held to be one of the wisest bibliophiles of his time and owned an important cabinet of medals. He wrote Observations et détails sur la collection des grands et des petits voyages (1742) and was elected to the Académie française in 1728.

External links
Académie française

1691 births
1744 deaths
Writers from Paris
French numismatists
French book and manuscript collectors
French non-fiction writers
French male non-fiction writers